Phu Soi Dao is a mountain in Southeast Asia. It is 2120 metres tall and rises at the south end of the Luang Prabang Range, on the border between Laos and Thailand. Phu Soi Dao National Park is on the Thai side of the range in Phitsanulok and Uttaradit Provinces.

Pinus kesiya, Betula alnoides, Schima wallichii and Shorea siamensis are among the species of trees present in the forest. Utricularia spinomarginata and Utricularia phusoidaoensis are endemic plants on Phu Soi Dao. There are numerous waterfalls in the range area.

See also
List of mountains in Thailand
Thai–Laotian Border War

References

External links
 Peakbagger listing

Mountains of Laos
Mountains of Thailand
International mountains of Asia
Laos–Thailand border
Luang Prabang Range